Franz Schmidt (1555 – 1634), also known as Meister Franz or Frantz Schmidt, was an executioner in Hof from 1573 to April 1578, and from 1 May 1578 till the end of 1617 he was the executioner of Nuremberg. He left a diary in which he detailed the 361 executions he performed during his 45-year career.

Personal and professional life 
Franz Schmidt's father, Heinrich, was originally a woodsman in the north-eastern Bavarian town Hof. Once, when the notoriously tyrannical margrave of Brandenburg-Kulmbach, Albrecht II (r. 1527–1553), wanted three men hanged, he picked out Heinrich from the crowd and forced him to perform the execution, after which he had no option but to continue in the profession of executioner.

Franz Schmidt was probably born in 1555, and was about 18 years old when he became executioner under his father's supervision in Bamberg in 1573. Five years later, in 1578, he secured the post as executioner in Nürnberg. He married the chief executioner's daughter Maria Beck, and eventually became chief executioner after his father-in-law. He fathered seven children, and his salary, on par with the city's wealthiest jurists, allowed him to have a spacious residence in Nürnberg. After his retirement in 1617, he began a new, lucrative career as a medical consultant and subsequently received an imperial privilege by Ferdinand II making him "ehrlich", i.e. an honourable member of society, and thus removing the stain of social stigma from his previous occupation. He was given a lavish funeral in 1634, in one of Nürnberg's prominent cemeteries. The grave is still present today.

Throughout his career as an executioner, Franz Schmidt also had a side job as a healer. According to Joel Harrington, a historian who authored an account of his life, Schmidt's own estimate of patients seeking medical advice amounted to some 15,000 consultations.

Social position of an executioner 
The societal position of the professional executioner was ambiguous, as Harrington explains

Furthermore,

Significance of diary 
His journal of punishments he executed survives, and contains accounts of 361 executions and 345 minor punishments (floggings and ear or finger amputations). The individual entries contain date, place, and method of execution, name, origin, and station in life of the condemned and – in later years more verbose than in the earlier ones – details of the crimes on which the sentence was based.

Schmidt executed criminals by rope, sword, breaking wheel, burning, and drowning. The wheel was reserved for severely violent criminals. Burnings (for homosexual intercourse and counterfeiting money) occurred only twice in his whole career, and drowning – prescribed by the Carolina for a woman committing infanticide – was commuted regularly in the Nuremberg of Schmidt's time into execution by sword, partly upon the intervention of Schmidt and some clergy.

Schmidt's journal is unique as a source of social history and history of law. The autograph no longer exists, but – according to the preface of a modern edition – libraries at Nuremberg and Bamberg owned, as late as 1913, four handwritten copies made between the 17th and the start of the 19th century. The first printed edition appeared in 1801.

References 
Notes

Sources
 God's Executioner, essay on December 21, 2009, Berlin Review of Books, by Joel Harrington, professor at Vanderbilt University, author of The Unwanted Child: The Fate of Foundlings, Orphans, and Juvenile Criminals in Early Modern Germany The University of Chicago Press, 2009.
A Hangman’s Diary: Being the Authentic Journal of Master Franz Schmidt, Public Executioner of Nuremberg 1573–1617. Translated by C. Calvert and A.W. Gruner. Edited, with an Introduction, by Albrecht Keller. Published by D. Appleton, second impression October, 1928.
 Meister Frantzen Nachrichter alhier in Nürnberg all sein Richten am Leben, published by J.M.F.v.Endter, Nürnberg, 1801
Zasky, Joel; Failure Magazine: The Faithful Executioner Joel F. Harrington on the life of sixteenth-century executioner Frantz Schmidt.
Executedtoday.com: June 5th: 1573: Meister Frantz Schmidt’s first execution, interview with Joel f. Harrington
WYPL Book Talk, May 11, 2013: Podcast - Joel Harrington, 40-minutes interview by Steven Usery with Joel F. Harrington on Frantz Schmidt
Harrington, Joel F. Excerpt from The Faithful Executioner at May 30, 2013 Slate Magazine: The Director of the Theater of Horror

External links 
Meister Frantzen Nachrichter alhier in Nürnberg all sein Richten am Leben
God's Executioner 

1550s births
1635 deaths
German executioners
Place of death missing
People from Bamberg
16th-century German people
17th-century German people